Michael Yechiel Sachs (3 September 1808 – 31 January 1864) was a Prussian rabbi from Groß-Glogau, Silesia.

Life
He was one of the first Jewish graduates from the modern universities, earning a Ph.D. degree in 1836. He was appointed Rabbi in Prague in 1836, and in Berlin in 1844. He took the conservative side against the Reform agitation, and so strongly opposed the introduction of the organ into the Synagogue that he retired from the Rabbinate rather than acquiesce.

Sachs was one of the greatest preachers of his age, and published two volumes of Sermons (Predigten, 1866–1891). He co-operated with Leopold Zunz in a new translation of the Bible. Sachs is best remembered for his work on Hebrew poetry, Religiöse Poesie der Juden in Spanien (1845); his more ambitious critical work (Beiträge zur Sprach- und Alterthumsforschung, 2 vols., 1852–1854) is of less lasting value. He turned his poetic gifts to admirable account in his translation of the Festival Prayers (Machzor, 9 vols., 1855), a new feature of which was the metrical rendering of the medieval Hebrew hymns. Another very popular work by Sachs contains poetic paraphrases of Rabbinic legends (Stimmen vom Jordan und Euphrat, 1853).

Publications
 Sachs, Michael, Die religiöse Poesie der Juden in Spanien, Berlin: Veit, 1845.
 Sachs, Michael, Stimmen vom Jordan und Euphrat: ein Buch fürs Haus, Frankfurt upon Main: Kauffmann, 1891
 Sachs, Michael, Predigten, edited by David Rosin from the bequest of Sachs, Berlin: Gerschel, 1866-1869.
 Sachs, Michael, Beiträge zur Sprach- und Alterthumsforschung: aus jüdischen Quellen: 2 parts, Berlin: Veit, 1852 and 1854.

References

External links 

 Digitized works by Michael Sachs at the Leo Baeck Institute, New York

1808 births
1864 deaths
19th-century German rabbis
German Orthodox rabbis
Silesian Jews
People from the Province of Silesia
People from Głogów